Kriegsfeld is a municipality in the Donnersbergkreis district, in Rhineland-Palatinate, Germany.

References

External links
 Ortsgemeinde Kriegsfeld

Municipalities in Rhineland-Palatinate
Donnersbergkreis